The Joliet Signal was a weekly, local newspaper which began publication in Joliet, Illinois, in 1844. This newspaper's title and publishers changed several times before finally being bought by Judge S. W. Randall and renamed the Juliet Signal.  When, in 1845, local residents changed the spelling of Juliet, Ill. to Joliet, Randall changed the Juliet Signal'''s name to Joliet Signal.The last known issue of the Signal'' is dated April 7, 1893.

References

External links 
 Illinois Digital Newspaper Collections: Juliet Signal (1846-1864)

Defunct newspapers published in Illinois
History of Joliet, Illinois